The Goal of the Month is a monthly segment on BBC's Match of the Day television programme, in honour of the best goal scored each month. The segment has been featured on the programme since the 1970–71 season. Typically, a selection of eight or ten goals from the month are shown before the Goal of the Month is decided. Until the 2006–07 season, viewers were given the chance to win a prize by selecting the correct winner and the winner would be decided by a vote firstly by post then by text and phone votes. For the majority of the 2007–08 season, the BBC did not allow any competitions due to a money-for-competitions-entry scandal, but towards the end of the season and for the goal of the season competition, normal service was resumed. When Match of the Day moved to Match of the Day 2 when Colin Murray presented the winner was decided by the subjective opinion of one of the pundits, such as Alan Hansen, Mark Lawrenson or Alan Shearer. From October 2013, BBC Match of the Day 2 viewers have picked the Goal of the Month in a poll conducted by voting on the BBC Sport website or sending the hashtag of the viewers favourite goal via Twitter.

The award of Goal of the Month was usually given as first-, second- and third-best goal of the month on Match of the Day up until the BBC lost the right to show Premier League highlights from 2000 to 2001. When highlights returned to the BBC for 2004–05, the format was reduced to only the best goal of the month being announced. Contending goals used to feature from other competitions which the BBC had the broadcasting rights for, most usually from the FA Cup, this was up to 2007–08 when its rights were transferred to ITV. Once the FA Cup returned to the BBC from 2014 to 2015, Goal of the Month remained exclusively a Premier League affair. The winners usually go forth to contest the Goal of the Season.

From the 2016–17 season, the Premier League has run its own Goal of the Month award, whose winners can conflict with the Match of the Day accolade, as had happened six times in its maiden season.

Records
 During the period in which a top three was announced each month, Dennis Bergkamp was the only player to have achieved the deemed first, second, and third best goals of the month in one calendar month, August 1997. Only two goals came from his hat-trick against Leicester City — not all three as is widely cited. The third was from a previous game against Southampton.
The record for the number of players having more than one nomination for GOTS in a season is three. This has happened twice, the first time in 1992–93 when Ryan Giggs (September and May), Dalian Atkinson (October and December) and Dwight Yorke (February and March) each won two Goal of The Month awards. The second was in 1995–96 with Tony Yeboah (August and September); Ian Wright (October and January) and Alan Shearer (December and April) each having two goals in contention. 
 There have been numerous occasions where two players have been nominated twice, but as of 2019–20, no player has yet had three goals selected in a Premier League season.
Kevin De Bruyne is the last player to have had two goals selected, in the 2019–20 season.
Consecutive GOTM wins has occurred only three times. The players to have achieved this are: Yorke in 1992–93 (February and March); Yeboah in 1995–96 (August and September) and Gareth Bale in 2012–13 (January and February).
Since the advent of the Premier League in 1992–93, Jack Wilshere is the only player to have won GOTS in consecutive seasons (2013–14 and 2014–15), although his latter win was controversial.
Wayne Rooney is the player with the most GOTS wins in the Premier League era, having won the award three times: 2004–05, 2006–07 and 2010–11.

Winners

1992–93

Key:

1993–94

Key:

1994–95

Key:

1995–96

Key:

1996–97

Key:

1997–98

Key:

1998–99
Key:

1999–2000

Key:

2000–01

Key:

2001–02
Awarded by ITV Sport's The Premiership.

2002–03

Awarded by ITV Sport's The Premiership.
Key:

2003–04
Awarded by ITV Sport's The Premiership.

Key:

2004–05
Key:

2005–06
Key:

2006–07

Key:

2007–08

Key:

2008–09

Key:

2009–10

Key:

2010–11

Key:

2011–12

Key:

2012–13
Key:

2013–14

Key:

2014–15

Key:

2015–16

Key:

2016–17

Key:

2017–18

Key:

2018–19

Key:

2019–20
Key:

2020–21
Key:

2021–22
Key:

2022–23

Players with multiple awards

Notes

See also 
 BBC Goal of the Season
 Premier League Goal of the Month

References 

Premier League on television
English football trophies and awards
Football mass media in the United Kingdom
Association football goal of the month awards